Robert Fruean (born 13 July 1988, in Wellington) is a retired New Zealand rugby union footballer. He is a midfield back and plays outside centre (13) and sometimes on the wing. He is a former Porirua College head boy. He is of Samoan & Cook islands heritage.

In 2007, he made the NZ team for the 2007 Under 19 Rugby World Championship. He led New Zealand to a championship win beating South Africa in the final. He also won the IRB Under-19 Player of the Year the same year.

He made his National Provincial Championship debut for Wellington against Auckland. He played 12 games for them scoring three tries before getting struck by illness. He subsequently underwent open-heart surgery for rheumatic heart disease, a potentially life-threatening inflammation of the heart.

In 2009 returned to rugby, making his Super 14 debut for the Hurricanes against Blues. This was his first and last game for the Hurricanes after which he defected to the Crusaders and played for them in the 2010 Super 14 season and the 2011 Super Rugby season, where he formed a formidable partnership with fellow centre Callum Ewing.

He made his 2010 ITM Cup debut for Canterbury, scoring two tries against Manawatu. The next week Fruean scored three more against North Harbour. He finished the season tied as the top try scorer with Lelia Masaga with 10 tries. In 2012, on the back of his third season with Canterbury, he was named ITM Cup player of the year at the New Zealand Rugby Awards.

He signed for Hawkes Bay Magpies in the ITM Cup in a two-year deal, starting from 2014. On 27 September 2016, Fruean signed for English club Bath in the Aviva Premiership from the 2016–17 season. In June 2017, Fruean joined Scottish Pro14 side Edinburgh on a two-year contract, ahead of the 2017–18 season.

References

External links
Chiefs profile
Canterbury profile

1988 births
Living people
New Zealand sportspeople of Samoan descent
New Zealand rugby union players
Rugby union wings
Rugby union centres
World Rugby Awards winners
Crusaders (rugby union) players
Hurricanes (rugby union) players
Canterbury rugby union players
Wellington rugby union players
Chiefs (rugby union) players
Hawke's Bay rugby union players
Rugby union players from Wellington City
Bath Rugby players
Edinburgh Rugby players
New Zealand expatriate rugby union players
New Zealand expatriate sportspeople in Scotland
Expatriate rugby union players in Scotland